Innolux Corporation is a company producing TFT LCD panels, established in 2003 and located in Taiwan.

Overview
Innolux Display Corp., following its merger with Chi Mei Optoelectronics and TPO Displays Corp., began operating under the name Innolux Corporation (INX) in March 2010.

With products spanning the full range of TFT-LCD panel modules and touch panels, including TV panels, desktop monitors and notebook computer panels, AV & mobile panels, Innolux is a TFT-LCD supplier to information technology and consumer electronics product makers worldwide.

Innolux's largest customers include Toshiba, Samsung, Philips, LG, Sony, Panasonic, Sharp, Lenovo, HP, Broteko, Dell & HDMIPI.

The 17in touch panel in Tesla, Inc. automobiles is an Innolux product.

In 2018 Innolux had the third highest R&D spending of any listed Taiwanese company. Innolux's investment of NT$11.3 billion represented 4.1 percent of its total sales. Innolux also investing NT$41.7 billion in fixed assets, the second most of any listed Taiwanese company.

History

 Chi Mei Optoelectronics is established on 6 August 1998.
 The department of TPO Displays is established on 24 December 1999.
 Innolux Display Corp. is originally established on 14 January 2003.
 Innolux Display Corp. publicly listed its shares on the Taiwan Stock Exchange on 24 October 2006.
 10/05/2009 Innolux Display Corp. and TPO Displays carry out merger via a share swap arrangement
 11/14/2009 Innolux Display Corp. and Chi Mei Optoelectronics carry out merger via a share swap arrangement, with Innolux Display Corp.
 03/18/2010 Innolux Display Corp. announces the completion of merger with Chi Mei Optoelectronics and TPO Displays.
 03/30/2010 Innolux Display Corp. officially changes its name to Chimei Innolux Corporation.
 03/16/2012 The board of directors elected Dr. Hsing Chien Tuan as new chairman of the board.
 12/26/2012 Chimei Innolux Corporation changes its name to “Innolux Corporation”.
 01/14/2013 Innolux Corp. to hold the 10-year anniversary celebration.

See also
 List of companies of Taiwan

References

Taiwanese companies established in 2003
Electronics companies of Taiwan
Electronics companies established in 2003
Display technology companies
Taiwanese brands
Foxconn